Rethem/Aller is a Samtgemeinde ("collective municipality") in the district of Heidekreis, in Lower Saxony, Germany. Its seat is in the town Rethem.

The Samtgemeinde Rethem/Aller consists of the following municipalities:

 Böhme 
 Frankenfeld 
 Häuslingen 
 Rethem

Samtgemeinden in Lower Saxony
Heidekreis